Leonardo Pinizzotto (born 14 August 1986) is an Italian cyclist, who last rode for UCI Continental team Amore & Vita-Selle SMP in 2014 season.

Palmarès
2011
1st, Stage 12 Tour du Maroc
2013
1st, Stage 3 Boucle de l'Artois
1st, Stage 1 Tour de Hokkaido
2014
1st, Stage 4 Tour de Beauce

References

1986 births
Living people
Italian male cyclists
Sportspeople from Pisa
Cyclists from Tuscany